Pol Greisch (born April 8, 1930 in Walferdange) is a writer from Luxembourg. He won the Servais Prize in 1993 for several plays, including Äddi Charel, Besuch, and E Stéck Streisel and in 2002, he was awarded the Batty Weber Prize for his entire literary work.

External links
Biography at the CNL

References

1930 births
Living people
Luxembourgian dramatists and playwrights
Luxembourgian screenwriters
Male screenwriters